Mātāwai is a small inland settlement in the Gisborne Region in the northeast of New Zealand's North Island. It is located on the upper reaches of the Motu River, in the Raukumara Range. It is on State Highway 2 between Gisborne and Opotiki.

The Matawai War Memorial Hall was opened in 1952, replacing a previous hall built in 1910. It was refurbished in 2016 to accommodate war rolls of honour from neighbouring communities.

Parks

The settlement's main reserve, Matawai Reserve, is a sports ground and local park.

Marae

The local Mātāwai Marae and Tapapa meeting house is a meeting place of Te Aitanga ā Māhaki's hapū of Ngā Pōtiki, Ngāti Mātāwai, Ngāti Wahia and Te Whānau a Taupara.

In October 2020, the Government committed $812,548 from the Provincial Growth Fund to upgrade it and Te Wainui Marae, creating 15.4 jobs.

Education

Matawai School is a Year 1-8 co-educational public primary school. In 2019, it was a decile 4 school with a roll of 58.

The nearby Otoko School was closed in 1997.

References

Populated places in the Gisborne District